The Old Man of Hoy is a  sea stack on Hoy, part of the Orkney archipelago off the north coast of Scotland. Formed from Old Red Sandstone, it is one of the tallest stacks in the United Kingdom. The Old Man is popular with climbers, and was first climbed in 1966. Created by the erosion of a cliff through hydraulic action some time after 1750, the stack is not more than a few hundred years old, but may soon collapse into the sea.

Geography
The Old Man stands close to Rackwick Bay on the west coast of Hoy, in Orkney, Scotland, and can be seen from the Scrabster to Stromness ferry. From certain angles it is said to resemble a human figure.

Geology

The Old Man of Hoy is a red sandstone stack, perched on a plinth of basalt rock, and one of the tallest sea stacks in the UK. It is separated from the mainland by a 60-metre (200 ft) chasm strewn with debris, and has nearly vertical sides with a top just a few metres wide. The rock is composed of layers of soft, sandy and pebbly sandstone and harder flagstones of Old Red Sandstone, giving the sides a notched and slab-like profile.

History
The Old Man is probably less than 250 years old and may be in danger of collapsing. The stack is not mentioned in the Orkneyinga saga, written 1230, and on the Blaeu map of 1600, a headland exists at the point where the Old Man is now. The McKenzie map of Hoy of 1750 similarly shows a headland but no stack, but by 1819 the Old Man had been separated from the mainland. William Daniell sketched the sea stack at this time as a wider column with a smaller top section and an arch at the base, from which it derived its name.

Sometime in the early nineteenth century, a storm washed away one of the legs leaving it much as it is today, although erosion continues. By 1992 a 40-metre (130 ft) crack had appeared in the top of the south face, leaving a large overhanging section that will eventually collapse.

Human activity

Climbing

The stack was first climbed by mountaineers Chris Bonington, Rusty Baillie and Tom Patey in 1966. From 8–9 July 1967, an ascent featured in The Great Climb, a live BBC three-night outside broadcast, which had around 15 million viewers. This featured three pairs of climbers: Bonington and Patey repeated their original route, whilst two new lines were climbed by Joe Brown and Ian McNaught-Davis and by Pete Crew and Dougal Haston.

In 1997, Catherine Destivelle made a solo ascent of the Old Man of Hoy; she did so while four months pregnant; her climb is captured in the 1998 climbing film, Rock Queen. This climb was filmed and has often been credited as the first solo ascent, but the Old Man had previously been soloed in October 1985 by Scots climber Bob Duncan; like Destivelle, he backroped the second, crux pitch, though he also backroped the top pitch because "it looked harder from below than it turned out to be".

Red Széll became the first blind person to climb the Old Man, despite suffering from retinitis pigmentosa that left him with 5% vision. With assistance from Martin Moran and Nick Carter, he scaled the stack in 2013.

The youngest person to climb the Old Man is Edward Mills, who was 8 years old when he completed the climb in 4 hours 55 minutes on 9 June 2018, to raise money for the charity Climbers Against Cancer as his mother had terminal breast cancer. He was accompanied by his trainers, Ben West and Cailean Harker.

There are seven routes up the stack, the most commonly used of which is the original landward facing East Face Route, graded E1 5b (Extremely Severe). A log book in a Tupperware container is buried in a cairn on the summit, as an ascensionists' record. As many as fifty ascents of the stack are made each year.

Highline

BASE jumping
Roger Holmes, Gus Hutchison-Brown, and Tim Emmett made the first BASE jump from the stack on 14 May 2008. Hutchinson-Brown died 11 days later during a jump in Switzerland. On 27 July 2019, two Poles, Filip Kubica and Dominik Grajner repeated BASE jumped from the top.

References

Citations

Sources

External links

  Catherine Destivelle's solo ascent in 1998

Climbing areas of Scotland
Landforms of Orkney
Stacks of Scotland
Tourist attractions in Orkney
Hoy